Talamasene "Tala" Leiasamaivao (born Fagaloa, 12 June 1967) is a Samoan rugby union player. He plays as a hooker.

Career

Club career
His last international cap was during a match against Fiji, at Apia, on 5 July 1997. He played for the Hurricanes in the Super 14, but he had his career cut short in 1998 as a result of a serious neck injury. Leiasamaivao played three times off the bench for the Hurricanes in 1997 as an understudy to Norm Hewitt, and again made three appearances in 1998, again all as substitute appearances. He played for Wellington between 1991–1994 and 1996–1997, winning a total of 29 caps. He scored a try in his final NPC match for Wellington in a high scoring end of season 42–44 loss to Auckland. Leiasamaivao also played for New Zealand Divisional XV in 1991, with two caps.  His career ended in 1998 due to a neck injury.

International career
He played internationals for Samoa for a number of years, with his first international cap during a match against Tonga at Nuku'alofa, on 29 May 1993. He lined up against the All Blacks in Auckland in 1993 and was part of the 1995 Rugby World Cup roster. He also made the New Zealand Colts early in his career and was an All Black trialist.

After career
After his retirement, he worked as Pacific Island Liaison coordinator for the Ministry of Pacific Island Affairs for three years.
He contested the 2005 general election for Destiny New Zealand in the  electorate.

References

External links
Tala Leiasamaivao international statistics
Tala Leiasamaivao at New Zealand Rugby History

1967 births
Samoa international rugby union players
Samoan rugby union players
Samoan expatriates in New Zealand
Rugby union hookers
Unsuccessful candidates in the 2005 New Zealand general election
Living people